William Goldman (1931–2018) was an American novelist, playwright and screenwriter.

William or Bill Goldman may also refer to:
William Goldman (photographer) (1856–1922), American photographer
William Goldman (mathematician) (born 1955), American mathematician
Bill Goldman (microbiologist), American microbiologist